Aksenovo is a rural locality (a village) in Lavrovskoye Rural Settlement, Sudogodsky District, Vladimir Oblast, Russia. The population was 11 as of 2010.

Geography 
Aksenovo is located 18 km north of Sudogda (the district's administrative centre) by road. Karpovo is the nearest rural locality.

References 

Rural localities in Sudogodsky District